1996 is the forty-ninth studio album by American country singer Merle Haggard, released in 1996. It was his last studio album on the Curb Records label, and was considered something of a return to form for Haggard despite poor sales.

Background
Despite good reviews, 1996 was the first studio album in Haggard's career not to chart. Curb's indifference to the release is commonly cited as a major factor in the LP's commercial failure, with country music critic, journalist and historian Michael McCall summarizing the situation in his AllMusic review of the album: "His record company didn't send promotional copies to reviewers until the album had been out for nearly a month, and no advertising or promotion has been devoted to the music. The album artwork and cover reflect this lack of care: the title, 1996, is boxed on the cover like a tomb, exactly like Hag's last set, 1994."  In his 2013 Haggard biography The Running Kind David Cantwell adds, "To be a singer and a writer with next to zero chance of being heard was maddening enough. That 1996 boasted several strong new originals only compounded the frustration." On "Beer Can Hill," a song that celebrates his Bakersfield roots, Haggard is joined by Dwight Yoakam and fellow country legend Buck Owens. 1996 also features contributions from John Anderson, Iris Dement, and Johnny Paycheck.

Reception

Michael McCall of AllMusic writes, "Recorded in Bakersfield, Haggard's album takes a jaunty yet melancholy look at a middle-aged man's concerns... The album's standout is a cover of Iris Dement's great 'No Time to Cry,' which Haggard fills with aged, tired wisdom."

Track listing 
"Sin City Blues" (Merle Haggard, Theresa Lane Haggard, Joe Manuel) – 2:28
"No Time to Cry" (Iris Dement) – 4:25
"Beer Can Hill" (Haggard, Abe Manuel, Jr.) – 3:16
"Truck Drivers' Blues" (Haggard, Tim Howard) – 3:04
"Too Many Highways" (Haggard, Max D. Barnes) – 2:59
"Five Days a Week" (Haggard) – 2:13
"Kids Get Lonesome Too" (Haggard, Lou Bradley) – 3:00
"If Anyone Ought to Know" (Haggard, Bonnie Owens) – 3:03
"Untanglin' My Mind" (Haggard, Clint Black) – 4:09
"Winds of Change" (Haggard, Terry Hardesty) – 3:28

Personnel
Merle Haggard – vocals, guitar
Norm Hamlet – steel guitar, dobro
Biff Adams – drums
Mark Yeary – piano
Don Markham – trumpet, saxophone, penny whistle
Jim Belkins – violin
Clint Strong – guitar
John Anderson – vocals
Dwight Yoakam – vocals
Buck Owens – vocals
Johnny Paycheck – vocals
Seymour Duncan – guitar
Eddie Curtis – bass
Iris DeMent – piano
Hilton Reed – guitar, bass, background vocals
Oleg Schramm – piano
Dawn Sears – background vocals
Leland Sklar – bass
Bob Teague – vocals
Bobby Wood – electric piano
Terry Hardesty – guitar
Tim Howard – guitar
Abe Manuel, Jr. – guitar, fiddle, percussion, accordion, harmony vocals
Joe Manuel – guitar, background vocals
Production notes:
Lou Bradley – producer, engineer
Merle Haggard – producer
Abe Manuel, Jr. – producer

References

1996 albums
Merle Haggard albums
Curb Records albums